Profundisepta voraginosa is a species of sea snail, a marine gastropod mollusk in the family Fissurellidae, the keyhole limpets and slit limpets.

Distribution
This marine species occurs off Natal, South Africa.

References

External links
 To World Register of Marine Species
 Herbert D.G. & Kilburn R.N. (1986). Taxonomic studies on the Emarginulinae (Mollusca: Gastropoda: Fissurellidae) of southern Africa and Mozambique. Emarginula, Emarginella, Puncturella, Fissurisepta, and Rimula. South Africa Journal of Zoology 21(1):1-27.
 Herbert D.G. (2015). An annotated catalogue and bibliography of the taxonomy, synonymy and distribution of the Recent Vetigastropoda of South Africa (Mollusca). Zootaxa. 4049(1): 1-98

Endemic fauna of South Africa
Fissurellidae
Gastropods described in 1986